The United States grain embargo against the Soviet Union was enacted by US President Jimmy Carter in January 1980 in response to the Soviet Union's invasion of Afghanistan in 1979. The embargo remained in effect until Ronald Reagan ended it in 1981 upon taking the office of president. American farmers felt the brunt of the sanctions, and it had a much lesser effect on the Soviet Union, which brought the value of such embargoes into question. During the presidential election campaign of 1980, Reagan, the Republican nominee, promised to end the embargo, but Carter, the incumbent Democratic nominee, was not willing to do so.

Causes 
The Soviet Union's invasion of Afghanistan in 1979 was met by the United States with numerous economic sanctions including the grain embargo. In addition, the United States led a boycott of the 1980 Olympics which were hosted in Moscow.

Effect on Soviet Union 
According to Boris Yuzhin and Oleg Gordievsky, the KGB abhorred Carter's sanctions. In 1980, according to both Yuzhin and Gordievsky, the KGB ordered its agents to conduct activities that discredited US President Jimmy Carter and supported Ronald Reagan during 1980 election.

The effect of the embargo on the Soviet Union was minimal, as it received grain from other sources such as by increasing imports from its second highest import partner, Argentina. The sources included most of South America such as Venezuela and Brazil. Those crops were cheaper than the American grain, as labor costs there were much cheaper. The Soviet Union still received grain from the United States with regard to the grain agreement in 1975 between the two countries. The agreement required the United States to send 8 million tons of grain to the Soviets. The embargo was a blessing in disguise for the Soviet Union, as it saw that it could go without the Americans' grain, but it could cultivate its own in Ukraine and import the grain from South America. Even after the embargo had been lifted, the Soviets continued to rely on grain from Ukraine and South America and reduced their interaction with the U.S.

Effect on United States 
The embargo had little effect on American prices. The embargo had a direct effect on the 1980 presidential election. In several states, farmers who were part of the farm strike movement circled their tractors around local state US Department of Agriculture offices to protest the department's enforcement of the embargo.

Key figures 
The main figure of the 1980 grain embargo was Carter. The grain embargo was his way of using food as a weapon. Carter believed that if he cut out the Soviets' grain imports, they could no longer feed their livestock or people. He hoped that would lead to unrest against the war in Afghanistan.

Another key figure in the grain embargo was the Farm Bureau. At first, it supported the embargo, which it saw as a way for farmers to sell more of their grain to Americans. As a result, grain prices dropped, and farmers became angry with the legislation and decided to protest against the embargo. When Jimmy Carter lost their support, it was the end for the embargo.

A year later, Reagan took power with the support of the Farm Bureau and ended the embargo.

Another key figure of the embargo was the farm strike movement. The American Agriculture Movement was a group of farmers who protested the embargo through peaceful means such as the incidents with encircling the department's headquarters in few states with their tractors. Their actions brought attention to the demands of the farmers for the embargo to be lifted.

References

Food politics
Soviet Union–United States relations
International sanctions
United States agricultural policy
Agriculture in the Soviet Union
1980 in the United States
1980 in the Soviet Union
Presidency of Jimmy Carter
Soviet–Afghan War
Embargoes
Grain trade
Foreign trade of the Soviet Union
Grain industry of the United States